Talaporfin (INN, also known as aspartyl chlorin, mono-L-aspartyl chlorin e6, NPe6, or LS11) is a chlorin based  photosensitizer used in photodynamic therapy (PDT).

It absorbs red light at 664-667 nm normally provided by a laser tuned to this wavelength.

It was approved in Japan (in 2004) for PDT of lung cancer and marketed as Laserphyrin.

References

Extracorporeal Photo-Immunotherapy for Circulating Tumor Cells

Photosensitizing agents
Tetrapyrroles